Grand Theft Auto Online is an online multiplayer action-adventure game developed by Rockstar North and published by Rockstar Games. It was released on 1 October 2013 for PlayStation 3 and Xbox 360, 18 November 2014 for PlayStation 4 and Xbox One, 14 April 2015 for Windows, and 15 March 2022 for PlayStation 5 and Xbox Series X/S. The game is the online component of Grand Theft Auto V. Set within the fictional state of San Andreas (based on Southern California), Grand Theft Auto Online allows up to 30 players to explore its open world environment and engage in cooperative or competitive game matches.

The open-world design lets players freely roam San Andreas, which includes an open countryside and the fictional city of Los Santos (based on Los Angeles). Players control a customisable silent protagonist in their journey to become a powerful criminal, slowly building an empire as they complete increasingly difficult tasks. Set both months before and years after the single-player campaign, Grand Theft Auto Online comprises cooperative missions where multiple players complete tasks to advance the narrative. The game also features numerous side missions and events, including the more advanced "Heists", and various businesses that players can purchase and manage to produce income.

Developed in tandem with the single-player mode, Grand Theft Auto Online was conceived as a separate experience to be played in a continually evolving world. At launch, it suffered widespread technical issues resulting in the inability to play missions and loss of character data. It initially polarised reviewers, being criticised for its lack of direction and repetitive missions, with praise particularly directed at the scope and open-ended gameplay. It won divided year-end accolades, ranging from Biggest Disappointment to Best Multiplayer, from several gaming publications. The game receives frequent free updates that further expand on the game modes and content, which has improved critical reception. The 2015 Heists update was especially well received by the critics.

Gameplay 
Developed in tandem with Grand Theft Auto V, Grand Theft Auto Online was conceived as a separate experience to be played in a continually evolving world. Up to 30 players freely roam across a re-creation of the single-player world and enter lobbies to complete jobs (story-driven competitive and cooperative modes). The Content Creator toolset lets players create their own parameters for custom jobs, like racetracks and deathmatch weapon spawn points. Players may band together in organised player teams called crews to complete jobs together. Rockstar Games Social Club extends crews formed in Max Payne 3 multiplayer mode to that of Grand Theft Auto Online. Players can create their own crews and join up to five total. Crews also have a hierarchy, crew leaders can change a members role in said hierarchy. Crews win multiplayer matches to earn experience points and climb online leaderboards.

In Grand Theft Auto Online, players create a new character specific to the online world, which shows on the screen's Switch Wheel alongside single-player characters Franklin, Michael, and Trevor. The player-characters are designed by a genetics-related process. Greater control is given to the character's clothes and hairstyles. The protagonist arrives in Los Santos by plane and is picked up by Lamar Davis, who gives the character a gun and a car. An hour-long tutorial introduces the player to the various game modes, driving, fighting, and game progression mechanics. The story is not central in the multiplayer, though it initially serves as a prequel to the single-player story, where characters from the single-player are woven in.

Similar to single-player, players can level up their character's attributes such as driving and stamina. Exclusive to GTA Online is a system of earning experience, usually by successful completion of activities. Accumulating enough experience to level up unlocks weapons, clothing, car customisations, and more advanced activities (such as parachuting and aircraft). Once unlocked, items need to be purchased with in-game currency, which can be earned or purchased with real money. Players can circumvent an activity's level requirements by joining a game with others of a sufficient rank. There are options to play alone or with friends, and an option for "Passive Mode", which makes the player immune to other players.

Aside from the open world, there are three main types of set activities: racing (by car, bike, aircraft, or boat), Deathmatch (team or free-for-all), and objective-based Contact Missions (simplified single-player-like storyline jobs, usually cooperative). Online uses lock-on aim and emphasises stealth in firefights. "Adversary Mode" adds several asymmetric variations on these activities, including "Siege Mentality" where one team is besieged by another, and "Hasta La Vista" where truckers chase down cyclists (reminiscent of the truck/motorcycle chase in Terminator 2: Judgment Day). "Survival" pits a team of up to four players against ten waves of enemies, similar to the Zombies mode in Call of Duty: Black Ops. The Heists Update released on 10 March 2015 adds five co-op elaborate multi-part missions, each mission having several setup jobs leading up to the finale crime which is a high-profit job. The player who is the heist leader has to unlock each heist in order and pay the upfront costs, while receiving the largest payoff (at the end, if successfully completed) and getting their progress saved, while other players (the crew members) can join any setup/finale jobs without prerequisite and get paid a cut for each mission passed. The heists, all requiring four players except the first which is two-player, often assign specific roles to players such as driver, gunner, etc. and/or may split them apart, and a headset is recommended for communicating with other players.

The game includes a content creation tool that lets players make automobile races and deathmatches. Players can choose the location, start and spawn points, and weapon and vehicle drops in deathmatches, and the location, route, race type, and player count in air, land, or sea races. Creations have to be tested against computer-controlled players before the mode is available online. The creations can also be published for others to use. Rockstar tags what they deem to be the best as "Rockstar Verified".

Plot 
The game's narrative begins in 2013, several months before Grand Theft Auto V. Players take on the role of a silent protagonist who moves to Los Santos in search for new pursuits. Upon arrival, they meet with Lamar Davis (Slink Johnson), whom they befriended on Lifeinvader. After a street race against the player, Lamar introduces them to drug dealer Gerald (Douglas Powell Ward) and corrupt Armenian car salesman Simeon Yetarian (Demosthenes Chrysan) for work. As the player slowly builds up their reputation, they attract the attention of individuals like Trevor Philips (Steven Ogg), hacker Lester Crest (Jay Klaitz), and Mexican drug lord Martin Madrazo (Alfredo Huereca), who also employ them.

Eventually, the player is offered bigger job opportunities by Lester, who recruits them for several bank robberies; a shady government agent known only as Agent 14 (Ryan Farrell), who has them break a convicted spy out of prison and raid a government-run lab; and Trevor, who enlists their help with a highly profitable drug deal. Later, Lamar also hires the player for a few jobs, which mostly consist of sabotaging rival gangs to set the stage for his eventual rise to power. However, this only leads to Lamar having a falling out with his own gang, so he attempts to win back their trust, once again with the player's help. During this time, the player slowly builds up their own criminal empire, starting with an initially small organisation, which is subsequently expanded by purchasing an office and several warehouses to aid the player in the theft and sale of various goods. Some time later, the player also starts a motorcycle club and begins running additional illicit businesses.

In 2017, the player continues to expand their empire by purchasing a bunker, from where they conduct a gunrunning operation alongside Agent 14, and a hangar, to help them run a smuggling operation with Trevor's former associate Ron Jakowski (David Mogentale). In December, Lester has the player purchase an ex-government underground facility, and introduces them to billionaire Avon Hertz (Sean McGrath) and his AI network Cliffford, who recruit them to help prevent an undisclosed future catastrophic event. During their mission, the group are joined by the International Affairs Agency (IAA), including Agent 14, and clash with a rogue Russian special ops unit led by a man named Bogdan (Vyto Ruginis). However, after eliminating most of the unit, Avon and Cliffford turn on the group, revealing their true intentions to trigger a nuclear armageddon, and that they have been using everyone to gain access to the state's defence system. Now joined by Bogdan, the group works to thwart Avon and Cliffford's plot, and are ultimately successful, after the player raids their secret facility and eliminates them both.

In July 2018, the player opens a new nightclub in Los Santos with the help of former Liberty City nightclub entrepreneur "Gay" Tony Prince (David Kenner), and begins using it as a front for their illicit businesses. In December, they become a top competitor in Arena War, a new demolition derby-like TV series taking place at the city's Maze Bank Arena. In July 2019, the player becomes a VIP member at the newly opened Diamond Casino & Resort, and begins assisting the staff with the various problems they are facing; primarily Texan businessman Avery Duggan, who is planning a hostile takeover. After disrupting his operations and defending the casino from several attacks, the player eventually kills Duggan, allowing his nephew Thornton to buy the casino after promising not to make any major changes. In December, the player and a retired Lester plan a robbery of the casino alongside Georgina Cheng (Christina Liang), sister of former casino owner Tao (Richard Hsu), who seeks retribution against Thornton for tricking her brother into selling him the casino. The heist is carried out successfully, humiliating Thornton, while Lester enters a relationship with Georgina.

In 2020, the player conducts several new jobs for Gerald, and enters a short-lived conflict with the Kkangpae after they raid their personal yacht, which ends with the player killing the gang's leader. In December, the player is hired by Martin Madrazo's son Miguel (Robbie Gottlieb) to steal some incriminating files of his family from Juan "El Rubio" Strickler (Joseph Melendez), the world's most notorious drug dealer and the Madrazo family's main supplier, who has threatened to report them to the DEA if they do not renegotiate their prices. As El Rubio rarely leaves his private and heavily guarded island, Cayo Perico, located offshore from Colombia, the player poses as the tour manager of the music group Keinemusik after they are invited to one of El Rubio's parties, in order to gain intel on the island. Afterward, with the help of their recently purchased submarine and its one-man crew, Pavel (Brandon Beilis), they plan a robbery of El Rubio's compound. The heist is ultimately successful, as the player escapes with both the files on Madrazo and various goods.

In July 2021, the player becomes a member of the LS Car Meet, an underground meeting place for fans of custom cars and street racing. There, they are introduced to Kenny "KDJ" Dixon Jr. and Sessanta (Emana Rachelle), who provide the player with several robbery contracts after they purchase an auto shop and prove themselves to them. In December, Lamar reaches out to the player again, to persuade them to invest in the business of his old friend, Franklin Clinton (Shawn Fonteno), who has recently started a celebrity solutions agency. Franklin manages to secure their first major contract with Dr. Dre, who had his phone stolen and needs it recovered before the unreleased music stored on it is leaked. The player works alongside Franklin and the agency's hacker specialist, Imani (Sarita Amani Nash), to track down the phone, only to discover that three copies have been made and distributed around Los Santos. The player investigates each lead and eventually recovers the stolen music. Afterwards, Imani learns that the culprit was Johnny Guns, a records producer at odds with Dre, and that he has sent hitmen to kill Dre at his recording studio. After the player saves Dre, they help him find and confront Guns, whom Dre beats with a golf club in revenge. As a token of appreciation for their help, Dre allows the player to be the first person to listen to his newest song. Meanwhile, Lamar, upset at being left out of Franklin's new dealings, starts his own cannabis business, LD Organics. Franklin and Lamar later attempt to diversify it by making a connection with a client involved in the Epsilon program. Although the client ultimately betrays them, the pair dismantle a rival business run by the Vagos gang, and their stunts draw widespread media attention, which Lamar takes advantage of to promote his business.

In July 2022, the player is contacted by Agent ULP (Jeff Steitzer) of the IAA, with whom they previously worked during the Doomsday Heist, and sworn in as an IAA agent so that they may investigate the recent increase of gasoline prices in San Andreas. Their investigation reveals that Mason Duggan, Thornton's younger brother, is responsible, using backup drives of Cliffford's AI bought from the Federal Investigation Bureau (FIB) to manipulate the prices and keep the Duggans' profits high. The player manages to retrieve all the backup drives and eventually intercepts a deal between Mason and the FIB, killing the former and ending the crisis. To ensure a similar incident does not occur again, Agent ULP then sends the player to Avon Hertz and Cliffford's old facility, which has been seized by the government, to retrieve the last traces of Cliffford's code, before cutting ties with them. In December, the player is introduced to a juggalo troupe called the Fooliganz, who are eager to start their own drug distribution ring, bringing them into conflict with The Lost motorcycle club, who run a similar operation. The player helps the Fooliganz and their leader, Dax, sabotage The Lost's operation and build up their own, after which they are officially welcomed into the troupe.

In early 2023, the Fooliganz's hangout is attacked by unknown assailants who kidnap Dax's "personal physician", Labrat (Courtney Gains), and steal blacklisted precursor chemicals previously acquired by the player. Investigating the attack, the player eventually discovers Dr. Isiah Friedlander (Bryan Scott Johnson), a renowned therapist and pharmaceutical corporation owner, to be responsible, requiring the chemicals and Labrat's talents to create a new psychedelic drug for therapeutic purposes and make a fortune. The player rescues Labrat and later boards Friedlander's plane as the latter attempts to flee to South America, recovering the stolen chemicals, despite Friedlander's escape.

Development 
Grand Theft Auto Online launched on 1 October 2013, two weeks after the release of Grand Theft Auto V. Many players reported that they had difficulties connecting to the game's servers and the Social Club web service, and others further reported that the game would freeze while loading early missions. Rockstar released a technical patch on 5 October in an effort to resolve the issues. The microtransaction system, which allows players to purchase game content using real money, was also suspended as a fail-safe. Problems persisted the second week following launch, and some players reported their player-character progress as having disappeared. Another technical patch was released on 10 October combating the issues, and players experiencing issues were told not to recreate their multiplayer avatars. As recompense for the technical issues, Rockstar offered a stimulus of GTA $500,000 (in-game currency) to the accounts of all players connected to Online since launch.

Rockstar announced in September 2015 that the PlayStation 3 and Xbox 360 versions of the online mode will no longer receive any new additional content, due to limitation in the console capacity. This was criticised by Forbes writer Paul Tassi, who felt that Rockstar was "cutting out a lot of potential customers" who continued to play on the older systems, adding that the re-releases on PlayStation 4 and Xbox One were lacking in additional content. In June 2021, Rockstar announced that the game's servers for the PlayStation 3 and Xbox 360 versions would shut down on December 16; microtransactions became unavailable for the platforms on September 15, and Social Club tracking closed on September 16.

A standalone version of Grand Theft Auto Online was released alongside the enhanced version of Grand Theft Auto V for PlayStation 5 and Xbox Series X/S on 15 March 2022; it was free on the former for the first three months. In addition to graphical enhancements and various quality of life improvements, this version features some exclusive content, such as new vehicles, an auto shop called Hao's Special Works where select vehicles can be upgraded for elite driving performances, and the Career Builder, which provides players with enough in-game currency to set up one of four businesses upon creating a new character. For a limited time, players could permanently transfer their progress from the previous generation consoles; earned in-game money could only be transferred across the same console family (PlayStation 4 to PlayStation 5, or Xbox One to Xbox Series X/S).

In early 2021, a user known as "t0st" reported they had found a way to reduce the loading times of GTA Online by up to 70% with an unofficial patch. Rockstar affirmed that the patch improved these load times, and officially included this patch into the game in March 2021 update, and thanked the user for the discovery, awarding them  from their Bug Bounty program.

Additional content 

Post-release content is continually added to Grand Theft Auto Online through free title updates.

2013
The Beach Bum update, released on 19 November 2013, added more beach-themed jobs and customisation content for players. The Deathmatch & Race Creators update was released on 11 December and allowed players to create their own deathmatches and races. The Capture Update was released on 17 December and added a new team-based capture the flag mode called Capture. On 24 December, the Holiday Gifts update added Christmas-themed items, discounts to in-game vehicles, weapons, apartments and other items, and snowfall to the game world. All the Holiday Gifts featured in this update were removed on 5 January 2014.

2014
Coinciding with the 2014 Valentine's Day, the Valentine's Day Massacre Special update was released on 13 February and added Bonnie and Clyde-themed content to the game for a limited time, until the end of February. The Business Update, released on 4 March, added multiple business-themed items to the game. On 11 April, the Capture Creator update was released that added the ability for players to create their own Capture jobs using the Content Creator. The High Life Update, released on 13 May, added several new contact missions, new vehicles, clothing items, and weapons. It also added new apartments, the ability to own two properties at the same time, and the Mental State gameplay statistic that monitors player behaviour in-game. The I'm Not a Hipster update was released on 17 June and added hipster-themed customisation items, and retro-themed vehicles and weapons.

The Independence Day Special update was released on 1 July to celebrate the U.S. Independence Day and added patriotic-themed vehicles, weapons and customisation items for a limited time. The patch added new properties to Grand Theft Auto Online and the "On Call Matchmaking" feature that lets player accept a job invite and keep playing until the lobby is full. The San Andreas Flight School update, released on 19 August, added new features and vehicles related to the in-game flying school. The Last Team Standing update was released on 2 October and added 10 new jobs, motorcycles, weapons and creator support for the Last Team Standing game mode. On 18 December, the Festive Surprise update was released and added two new weapons, four holiday-themed vehicles and clothing items, which were made unavailable after 5 January 2015. The update also added the ability to buy a third property, and saw the return of snowfall to the game world.

2015
The Heists update, which added five multi-part missions with large payouts that can be completed by teams of four players, was a highly anticipated feature of Grand Theft Auto Online. Aside from the heists, the update also introduced Adversary Modes, and several new weapons and vehicles. After numerous delays, the Heists update launched on 10 March 2015, suffering some initial technical difficulties due to the increased user load. Ill-Gotten Gains Part 1, released on 10 June, added new vehicles, clothing items and weapon decals. Some gameplay features were also affected, such as a redesign of the in-game car websites, the addition of a first-person vehicle hood camera in the PlayStation 4 and Xbox One versions, and the ability to cycle through targets when using lock-on missiles, among other minor changes. Ill-Gotten Gains Part 2, released on 8 July, added vehicles and weapons. It also added the radio station The Lab, previously exclusive to the Windows version of the game, to all other versions. This was also the final update for both the Xbox 360 and the PlayStation 3, citing hardware limitations. The Freemode Events update launched on 15 September, and added new modes and activities. It also added the Rockstar Editor and Director Mode, previously exclusive to the Windows version of the game, to the Xbox One and PlayStation 4 versions.

Lowriders, released on 10 October, added a new series of missions given by Lamar, new vehicles, vehicle upgrades, weapons (including the machete and machine-pistol), and clothing items. It also introduced a new vehicle shop, Benny's Original Motor Works, which allows players to customise Lowriders, including upgrades such as interior customisation, hydraulics, and decals. Halloween Surprise, released on 29 October, featured two new Halloween-themed vehicles, flashlight and additional masks and ornaments, along with slasher-themed Adversary Modes; the additional content featured in this update was only temporarily, and was removed on 16 November. The Executives and Other Criminals update released on 15 December and added new customisable Penthouse Apartments, new vehicles, and a new game mode entitled Extraction, as well as the ability to form organisations of players with exclusive missions. The Festive Surprise update returned on 21 December with snowfall, both new and old festive-themed clothes and masks, and a new car. It also added a new Adversary Mode, which was released on 23 December.

2016
An update released on 28 January 2016 added a new Adversary Mode called Drop Zone and two new sports cars. The Be My Valentine update launched on 10 February and, in addition to the content featured in the previous Valentine's Day-themed update, added new outfits, cars, and couple-themed Adversary Mode. The Lowriders: Custom Classics update, released on 15 March, added three cars available for customisation along with new weapons, clothes and an Adversary Mode called Sumo. Further Adventures in Finance and Felony was released on 7 June, and added executive offices and cargo warehouses, available for purchase to all players who are part of an organisation, as well several new organisation-related missions, challenges, vehicles, clothing items, weapon attachments, and Adversary Mode called Trading Places. The Cunning Stunts update, released on 12 July, added 13 new vehicles and 16 stunt races.

The Bikers update, released on 4 October, introduced motorcycle clubs, which function similarly to organisations, and come with purchasable clubhouses and businesses, such as counterfeit cash factories and weed farms, as well as club-related missions given by Malc (Walter Mudu), a character first introduced in Grand Theft Auto IV: The Lost and Damned. The update also added new bikes, biker-themed weapons, tattoos, and clothing items, and a new Adversary Mode. Released on 8 November, the Deadline update added a new Adversary Mode compared by critics to the light cycle races from Disney's Tron film franchise, specifically those seen in the 2010 film, Tron: Legacy. 13 December saw the release of both the Import/Export and Festive Surprise 2016 updates. The former, an expansion to the Finance and Felony update, introduced vehicle warehouses and Special Vehicle Work missions available to all players who are part of organisations. The latter added more Christmas-themed content to the game.

2017
The Cunning Stunts: Special Vehicle Circuit, released on 14 March 2017, introduced special vehicle stunt races and 20 additional races. The Gunrunning update was released on 13 June and introduced purchasable underground bunkers, which players can turn into illegal weaponry research, storage and production facilities. It also introduced new vehicles such as armoured personnel carriers and armed off-road cars, and the Mobile Operations Center (MOC), which provides a new level of customisation for weapons and vehicles, as well as special missions that reward players with discounts for some of the vehicles featured in this update. The Smuggler's Run update, released on 29 August, added purchasable hangars and a new type of business related to them: air cargo smuggling. The update also introduced a number of new aircraft, which can be stored inside the players' hangars, and a new Adversary Mode.

The Doomsday Heist, released on 12 December, added a new take on heists. The eponymous Doomsday Heist, longer and more profitable than any of the original heists, is split into three "acts", which can be completed by a group of 2-4 players from start to finish. Each act features its own setup missions, half of which take place in freemode and can be sabotaged by other players. The update also introduced a new type of properties—underground facilities—which are required for the heist, and a large extent of military-grade vehicles and weapons. Later that month, the Festive Surprise update returned with new and old holiday-themed content.

2018
Released on 20 March 2018, Southern San Andreas Super Sport Series added new races, vehicles, and game modes. The After Hours update, released on 24 July, introduced a new nightlife-related business, alongside the return of "Gay" Tony Prince from Grand Theft Auto: The Ballad of Gay Tony, who helps players run their nightclubs. Each club also features an underground portion that can be used to smuggle goods produced by the players' other businesses, such as drugs and weapons. The update also added new missions, vehicles, clothing items, one weapon, and songs by real-life DJs Solomun, Tale of Us, Dixon and The Black Madonna, all of whom can be hired to work for the players' nightclubs after assisting them with several favours. One of the vehicles introduced in the update, the Oppressor Mk II (a hovering motorcycle that can be equipped with machine guns or homing missiles as well as flare countermeasures), has since gained notoriety within the game's community for facilitating griefing.

The Arena War update, released on 11 December, introduced new demolition derby-themed Adversary Modes at the city's Maze Bank Arena, featuring armoured vehicles likened to those from Mad Max and Robot Wars. Once players buy a garage at the Arena, they can earn "Arena Points" from participating in these Adversary Modes, which can be used to unlock special cosmetics for their character and vehicles, also added with the update. The Festive Surprise update returned later that month with snowfall, holiday-themed items, three new vehicles, two Arena War Adversary Modes, and a new weapon, as well as discounts on various items and double earnings for several jobs.

2019

The Diamond Casino & Resort update, released on 23 July 2019, introduced the eponymous casino, where players can engage in various gambling minigames and purchase a highly customisable penthouse, which gives them access to exclusive areas of the casino and casino-related missions. The update also added new vehicles, clothing items, a new type of currency—casino chips—and other casino-related activities. The in-game gambling activities are not available in certain regions, including a few US states, due to differing laws and regulations.

The Diamond Casino Heist, released on 12 December, added a new heist with a different approach from the previous ones, but reminiscent of the heists from the single-player story. Unlike the original heists or The Doomsday Heist, all setup missions are done in freemode and can be completed by one player, with only the heist itself requiring at least two people. Players can also hire NPC accomplices to facilitate the heist, who take different cuts depending on their skill level. To unlock the heist, players must once again buy a new property, also added with the update: arcades. While mainly used as fronts for planning the heist and not actually a profitable business, the arcades are highly customisable, and can be expanded with new arcade games. The Diamond Casino Heist also introduced 20 new vehicles, two weapons, several clothing items, and an in-game radio station curated by rappers Danny Brown and Skepta. Later that month, the Festive Surprise update returned with new and old holiday-themed content, a new vehicle, and discounts on various items and properties.

2020
Gerald's Last Play is a series of six cooperative missions given by Gerald that were added on 23 April 2020, as a continuation of The Diamond Casino Heist update. The Los Santos Summer Special, released on 11 August, added new yacht-themed missions, vehicles, Adversary Modes, race tracks, and the Open Wheel Race Creator, which allows players to create their own custom tracks. The update also featured several quality-of-life improvements, such as adding the possibility of owning up to eight properties.

First teased in July as "a new take on heists in an entirely new location", The Cayo Perico Heist was officially announced in November, when it was revealed that it would add a new island to the game's map; making it the biggest Grand Theft Auto Online content update to date. The heist featured in the update, which consists of robbing the drug cartel that controls the island, has been described as the "next evolution in Heists gameplay", because it offers more approaches than all previous heists, including the possibility of being completed solo from start to finish, and can play out in various ways depending on player actions. The update was also said to add several new vehicles, including a military submarine, which is required for the heist, weapons, and music. In December, it was revealed that The Cayo Perico Heist would also add a new nightclub called the Music Locker underneath the Diamond Casino & Resort, featuring real-life musicians Moodymann, Keinemusik, and Palms Trax; three radio stations (two of which are hosted by Joy Orbison and Julian Casablancas); and new songs on some of the already existing stations. The update was released on 15 December to largely positive reception.

2021 
On 27 May 2021, eight stunt races were added to the game, followed by seven new arenas for the "Deadline" mode on 24 June, and seven maps for "Survival" on 8 July. Los Santos Tuners, released on 20 July, added a new social place called the "LS Car Meet", which includes several facilities, such as a mod shop, a merch shop with exclusive clothing items, and a test track where players can try out new vehicles for free. The meet also features a reputation system and "Prize Ride Challenges"—a series of race-related challenges which change weekly and award players with new vehicles. The update also added new street races, 17 highly-customizable tuner vehicles, and a new type of properties—auto shops—which allow players to complete robbery contracts, steal vehicles for export, or operate a legitimate car repair and customisation business.

First announced on 8 December and released on 15 December, The Contract is a story-focused expansion that adds a new business, "F. Clinton and Partner", a celebrity solutions agency which is run with the help of Franklin Clinton, one of the protagonists from the single-player game. The Agency's first high-tier client is Dr. Dre, who had his phone containing unreleased music stolen and needs it recovered before the tracks are leaked. The missions added with The Contract are structured similarly to past Heists, in that players are required to complete several prerequisite investigation jobs before they can move on to recovering the stolen music. Aside from the Dr. Dre-related missions, the update also provides smaller jobs such as Contracts, which increase the passive income generated by the Agency over time; payphone assassinations; and a three-mission storyline revolving around Lamar's new cannabis business, where players get to control either Lamar or Franklin. The Contract also adds 17 new vehicles (some of which can be equipped with exclusive upgrades, like armour and remote control, at the Agency), three weapons (the Heavy Rifle, the stun gun, and a compact EMP launcher), various clothing items, a new radio station curated by musicians Rosalía and Arca, and an update to two of the already existing stations, including new music created by Dr. Dre and other artists, such as Anderson .Paak and Snoop Dogg, for the game, released as singles on 4 February 2022.

2022 
On 13 January 2022, a new Adversary Mode featuring Franklin and Lamar was added to the game. There was no public announcement from Rockstar regarding the mode, which Kotakus Zack Zwiezen partly attributed to the ongoing #SaveRedDeadOnline campaign, in which numerous players criticized Rockstar for the lack of new content in Red Dead Online compared to Grand Theft Auto Online. The Criminal Enterprises, released on 26 July, added new missions which see players assuming the role of IAA agents to investigate the recent increase of gasoline prices in San Andreas, as well as an expansion to several previously released businesses—cargo warehouses, biker clubhouses, bunkers, and nightclubs. The update also introduced a number of new vehicles, customization options, and long-requested quality-of-life improvements, such as an increased payout and lower setup cost for older Heists, a reworked Interaction Menu, and the ability to sell products from all businesses in non-public sessions. Several other features, such as a car showroom which allows players to test drive vehicles before purchasing them, were introduced in the weeks following the update's release.

Los Santos Drug Wars, released on 13 December, introduced new story missions, vehicles, and clothing items, as well as a new social place, "The Freakshop", an abandoned warehouse frequented by juggalos which doubles as a storage for a mobile drug lab, also added with the update. The lab functions similarly to other passive businesses in the game, and can be upgraded to increase its productiveness by completing a new type of side missions, "Fooligan Jobs". The update also featured several quality-of-life improvements, such as an increased payout for the smuggling business and the ability to hide phone contacts. On 22 December, new Christmas-themed weapons and clothing items were added for a limited time, along with snowman collectibles and two random events (one inspired by the 1988 film Die Hard and the other by Dr. Seuss' Grinch character) that have a chance of triggering in the open world.

2023 
On 16 February 2023, a new multi-floor vehicle garage, shop robbery random events, collectible drug caches, and street dealers (who function similarly to the drug dealing minigame from Grand Theft Auto: Chinatown Wars) were added as a continuation of the Los Santos Drug Wars update. On 16 March, the second part of the Los Santos Drug Wars update, titled The Last Dose, was released, featuring new story missions, vehicles and clothing items.

Reception 

Many reviewers bemoaned their initial play experience as Grand Theft Auto Online suffered widespread technical issues at launch. Destructoids Chris Carter felt the "messy launch" should have been delayed and IGN's Keza MacDonald lamented her "disastrous" play sessions. Digital Spy's Liam Martin lost his character data and considered the technical issues dwarfed pre-launch anticipation. Some reviewers generally praised the game's open-ended and dynamic content; VideoGamer's Jon Denton thought the gameplay's "endlessness" made up for its problems and Digital Spy's Martin complimented the game's scope.

Its PlayStation 4 and Xbox One re-release received similar critical reactions. IGN's Dan Stapleton reported low player counts in matches, long wait times in lobbies, server disconnection and occasional crashes. "Because of that," he wrote, "I can't strongly recommend ... the multiplayer experience alone". VideoGamer.com found progression more streamlined and balanced than before and thought the "grind of just doing PvP until co-op Jobs arrive with regularity" was lost. However, they noted frequent server disconnection, especially during load screens. Game Informers Andrew Reiner reported "minimal lag or issues in the expanded firefights and races".

Other game aspects received similar criticism. The character creation system was panned as unintuitive with resulting unattractive avatars. IGN's MacDonald thought the gameplay's "addictive rhythm" eventually faltered as errands became a monotony. GameSpot's Carolyn Petit thought the game's early mission palette was marred by "bland last team standing deathmatches". Eurogamers Rich Stanton found cooperative gameplay repetitive as players completed the same menial objective cycle. GameSpot's Mark Walton thought the frenetic action lacked direction, with PvP an "unending cycle of pointless slaughter". He considered the reputation system a weak deterrent against foul play and thought the unbalanced game economy was further hindered by low mission payouts.

Reception has improved over time. VG247s Patrick Garratt felt the San Andreas Flight School update incentivised player engagement with the oft-neglected aircraft missions by offering more liberal reward payouts. Digital Spy's Martin thought the Heists update encouraged teamwork and "pinpoint coordination", while IGN's Ryan McCaffrey found high replay value in the heists' volatile action. Eurogamers Stanton enjoyed the strategic planning necessary to pull off a successful heist and thought players were required to think on their feet and adapt to changing scenarios. He further noted occasional gameplay pacing issues and technical hiccups such as mid-mission server disconnection.

The game won Best Multiplayer at the 10th British Academy Games Awards and from GameTrailers. Game Revolution and Hardcore Gamer nominated it for Biggest Disappointment. At the 2019 Golden Joystick Awards, the game was nominated for Still Playing and won Best Game Expansion for The Diamond Casino & Resort. Take-Two Interactive, Rockstar's parent company, stated that by February 2014, 70 percent of Grand Theft Auto V players with Internet access had played Grand Theft Auto Online, and that the game's micro-transactions system was the largest contributor to the company's digital revenue since the launch of Grand Theft Auto Online.

Notes

References

External links 
 

2013 video games
Action-adventure games
Euphoria (software) games
Online
Grand Theft Auto V
Multiplayer online games
Multiplayer video games
Open-world video games
Organized crime video games
Persistent worlds
Massively multiplayer online role-playing games
PlayStation 3 games
PlayStation 4 games
PlayStation 5 games
Rockstar Advanced Game Engine games
Take-Two Interactive games
Video games developed in the United Kingdom
Video games set in 2013
Video games set in 2017
Video games set in 2018
Video games set in 2019
Video games set in 2020
Video games set in 2021
Video games set in 2022
Video games set in 2023
Video games set in the Caribbean
Video games set in the United States
Video games set on fictional islands
Video games with customizable avatars
Video games with user-generated gameplay content
Windows games
Xbox 360 games
Xbox One games
Xbox Series X and Series S games